Keith Robert Andreassi DeCandido (born April 18, 1969) is an American science fiction and fantasy writer and musician, who works on comic books, novels, role-playing games and video games, including numerous media tie-in books for properties such as Star Trek, Buffy the Vampire Slayer, Doctor Who, Supernatural, Andromeda, Farscape, Leverage, Spider-Man, X-Men, Sleepy Hollow, and Stargate SG-1.

Early life

DeCandido was born in the Bronx in New York City, the son of Robert L. DeCandido and GraceAnne Andreassi DeCandido. He claims to have been a Star Trek fan even before his birth, as his parents were fans of Star Trek: The Original Series.

DeCandido attended New Rochelle Academy, and then Cardinal Spellman High School in the Bronx before attending Fordham University. While attending Fordham University, DeCandido worked as an editor and writer of one of the college newspapers, called simply the paper.

Career
After graduation, DeCandido worked as editor at several publishing companies. Along with John Drew, in the 1990s he co-produced a public-access television cable TV show in Manhattan about science fiction called The Chronic Rift, which he also co-hosted. DeCandido and Drew and others revived the show as a podcast in 2008. DeCandido also used to host his own monthly podcast, Dead Kitchen Radio, on hiatus as of February 2019.

While DeCandido spent much of his career writing Star Trek fiction, he has written tie-ins for other popular sci-fi and fantasy series as well, such as Buffy the Vampire Slayer, Doctor Who, Supernatural, Stargate SG-1, Sleepy Hollow, Farscape, and Leverage as well as comic books (Spider-Man, X-Men), movies (Cars, Serenity, Alien), role-playing games (Dungeons & Dragons), and video games (World of Warcraft, StarCraft, Command & Conquer, Resident Evil). He has also written fiction in universes of his own creation, including that of the 2004 novel Dragon Precinct, a high-fantasy police procedural, and a series of short stories about Cassie Zukav, a scuba diving tour guide in Key West who learns she is a Dís. Other worlds of DeCandido's own creation include The Adventures of Bram Gold and the Super City Cops series. He has also edited various anthologies, including OtherWere, Urban Nightmares, Imaginings, Double Trouble: An Anthology of Two-Fisted Team-Ups, The Four ???? of the Apocalypse, the Doctor Who collection Short Trips: The Quality of Leadership, and the Star Trek anthologies New Frontier: No Limits, Tales of the Dominion War, and Tales from the Captain's Table.

In 2009, DeCandido was named Grandmaster by the International Association of Media Tie-In Writers.

He has written rewatches for Tor.com since 2011, including Star Trek: The Original Series, Star Trek: The Next Generation, Star Trek: Deep Space Nine, Star Trek: Voyager, Star Trek: Enterprise, Stargate, Batman 1966, and "4-Color to 35-Millimeter: The Great Superhero Movie Rewatch," about every live-action superhero movie based on a comic book. DeCandido also writes reviews and commentary for Tor.com, including reviews of many of TV adaptions of comic books and of the new Star Trek shows Star Trek: Discovery, Star Trek: Picard, Star Trek: Lower Decks, Star Trek: Strange New Worlds, Star Trek: Prodigy, and Short Treks.

DeCandido is an avid baseball fan, particularly of the New York Yankees. He has contributed in the past to both the Replacement Level Yankees Weblog and Pinstripe Alley, and he currently serves as an occasional freelance editor for the Society for American Baseball Research.

Bibliography

Star Trek novels
The Next Generation - Diplomatic Implausibility (2001), 
Deep Space Nine - Gateways: Demons of Air and Darkness (2001), 
The Brave and the Bold (2002),  (Book 1),  (Book 2)
The Lost Era - The Art of the Impossible (2003), 
I.K.S. Gorkon - A Good Day to Die (2003), 
I.K.S. Gorkon - Honor Bound (2003), 
The Next Generation - A Time for War, A Time for Peace (2004), 
Ferenginar: Satisfaction Is Not Guaranteed in Worlds of Deep Space Nine Volume 3 (2005), 
I.K.S. Gorkon - Enemy Territory (2005), 
Articles of the Federation (2005), 
The Mirror-Scaled Serpent in Mirror Universe - Obsidian Alliances (2007), 
The Next Generation - Q&A (2007),  (nominee, Best Speculative Fiction Novel, Scribe Awards)
Klingon Empire - A Burning House (2008), 
A Gutted World in Myriad Universes - Echoes and Refractions (2008), 
A Singular Destiny (2009),  (nominee, Best Speculative Fiction Novel, Scribe Awards)

Star Trek novellas, short stories, comic books, etc.
The Next Generation - Perchance to Dream (four-issue comic book miniseries, art by Peter Pachoumis and Lucian Rizzo, with Scott Benefiel, February–May 2000) -- collected in Enemy Unseen (2001), alongside "The Killing Shadows" and "Embrace the Wolf"
"Horn and Ivory" in Gateways: What Lay Beyond (2002), 
"Broken Oaths" in Deep Space Nine - Prophecy and Change (2003), 
"Revelations" in New Frontier - No Limits (2003), 
"The Ceremony of Innocence Is Drowned" in Tales of the Dominion War (2004), 
"loDnIpu' vavpu' je" ("Brothers and Fathers") in Tales from the Captain's Table (2005), 
"Letting Go" in Voyager - Distant Shores (2005), 
"Four Lights" in The Next Generation - The Sky's the Limit (2007), 
"Family Matters" in Mirror Universe - Shards and Shadows (2009), 
Alien Spotlight: Klingons: Four Thousand Throats... (comic book, art by JK Woodward, 2009; winner, Best Single Issue of a Comic Book, TrekMovie.com) -- collected in Alien Spotlight Volume 2 (2010), alongside Q, Romulans, Tribbles, and Cardassians.
"The Unhappy Ones" in Seven Deadly Sins (2010)
Captain's Log: Jellico (comic book, art by JK Woodward, 2010) -- collected in Captain's Log (2011), alongside Sulu, Pike, and Harriman.
The Klingon Art of War (2014), 
several chapters of Star Trek Adventures: Klingon Empire Core Rulebook (2020)
Star Trek Adventures: Incident at Kraav III (with Fred Love, 2022)
"You Can't Buy Fate" in Star Trek Explorer #7 (2023)
"Work Worth Doing" in Star Trek Explorer #9 (2023)

Star Trek eBooks
S.C.E. (Starfleet Corps of Engineers) series (2000–2006)
Fatal Error (2000)
Cold Fusion (2001)
Invincible Books 1-2 (w/David Mack, 2001)
Gateways epilogue: Here There Be Monsters (2001)
War Stories Books 1-2 (2002)
Breakdowns (2003)
Security (2005)
What's Past Book 6: Many Splendors (2006)
The Next Generation - Slings and Arrows Book 6: Enterprises of Great Pitch and Moment (2008)

Precinct novels
Dragon Precinct (2004), a high fantasy police procedural story and DeCandido's first original novel
Unicorn Precinct (2011), sequel to Dragon Precinct
Goblin Precinct (2012), sequel to Unicorn Precinct
Gryphon Precinct (2013), sequel to Goblin Precinct
Tales from Dragon Precinct (2013), short-story collection
Mermaid Precinct (2019), sequel to Gryphon Precinct
Phoenix Precinct (2022), sequel to Mermaid Precinct
Manticore Precinct (forthcoming), sequel to Phoenix Precinct
More Tales from Dragon Precinct (forthcoming), second short-story collection

Precinct short stories
"Getting the Chair" in Murder by Magic (2004; reprinted in Tales from Dragon Precinct, 2013), 
"Crime of Passion" in Hear Them Roar (2006; reprinted in Tales from Dragon Precinct, 2013), 
"House Arrest" in Bad-Ass Faeries (2007; reprinted in Tales from Dragon Precinct, 2013 and The Best of Bad-Ass Faeries, 2017)
"A Clean Getaway" in Pandora's Closet (2007; reprinted in Tales from Dragon Precinct, 2013)
"Fire in the Hole" in Dragon's Lure (2010; reprinted in Tales from Dragon Precinct, 2013)
"When the Magick Goes Away," Kickstarter-supported (2012; reprinted in Tales from Dragon Precinct, 2013)
"Catch and Release" in Tales from Dragon Precinct (2013)
"Brotherly Love" in Tales from Dragon Precinct (2013)
"Blood in the Water" in Tales from Dragon Precinct (2013)
"Heroes Welcome" in Tales from Dragon Precinct (2013)
"Gan Brightblade vs. Mitos the Mighty," Kickstarter-supported (2014)
"Baker's Dozen," Kickstarter-supported (2017)
"Chaos Theory" in reissue of Gryphon Precinct (2018)
"The Fall of Iaron," Kickstarter-supported (2019)
"The Midwinter of Our Discontent" in Release the Virgins! (2019)
"Used to Be" in Across the Universe: Tales of Alternative Beatles (2019)
"The Gorvangin Rampages," Indiegogo-supported (2020)

Other novels
Spider-Man: Venom's Wrath (written with Jose R. Nieto, 1998), 
Young Hercules: Cheiron's Warriors (1999), 
Young Hercules: The Ares Alliance (1999), 
Farscape: House of Cards (2001), 
Andromeda: Destruction of Illusions (2003), 
Spider-Man: Down These Mean Streets (2005),  (reprinted in Spider-Man: The Darkest Hours Omnibus, 2021, 
World of Warcraft: Cycle of Hatred (2006), 
Buffy the Vampire Slayer: Blackout (2006), 
StarCraft Ghost: Nova (2006), 
Buffy the Vampire Slayer: The Deathless (2007),  (nominee, Best YA Novel, Scribe Awards)
Command & Conquer: Tiberium Wars (2007), 
Supernatural: Nevermore (2007), 
CSI: NY: Four Walls (2008), 
Supernatural: Bone Key (2008), 
Mack Bolan, Executioner: Code of Honor (under Don Pendleton's name, 2009), 
Supernatural: Heart of the Dragon (2010) 
Mack Bolan, Executioner: Deep Recon (under Don Pendleton's name, 2010)
Dungeons & Dragons: Under a Crimson Sun (2011), 
Super City Police Department: The Case of the Claw (2011)
The Scattered Earth: Guilt in Innocence (2011)
Leverage: The Zoo Job (2013),  (nominee, Best General Original Novel, Scribe Awards)
Sleepy Hollow: Children of the Revolution (2014),  (nominee, Best Speculative Original Novel, Scribe Awards)
Stargate SG-1: Kali's Wrath (2016), 
Marvel's Thor: Dueling with Giants (2015), Book 1 of the Tales of Asgard trilogy, 
Marvel's Sif: Even Dragons Have Their Endings (2016), Book 2 of the Tales of Asgard trilogy, 
Marvel's Warriors Three: Godhood's End (2017), Book 3 of the Tales of Asgard trilogy, 
A Furnace Sealed (2019), Book 1 of the Adventures of Bram Gold, 
To Hell and Regroup (with David Sherman, 2020),  Book 3 of Sherman's "18th Race" trilogy
Animal (with Munish K. Batra, MD, FACS, 2021), 
Feat of Clay (forthcoming in 2023), Book 2 of the Adventures of Bram Gold

Novelizations
Gargantua (1998),  (as K. Robert Andreassi)
Buffy the Vampire Slayer: The Xander Years Volume 1 (1999), 
Darkness Falls (2003), 
Resident Evil: Genesis (2004), 
Resident Evil: Apocalypse (2004), 
Serenity (2005), 
Resident Evil: Extinction (2007), 
Alien: Isolation, computer game novelization (2019),

Novellas
-30- (w/Steven Savile, 2012; reprinted in Without a License, 2015), part of the Viral series
Heroes Reborn: Save the Cheerleader, Destroy the World (2015; reprinted in Heroes Reborn Collection Two, 2016)
Super City Cops: Avenging Amethyst (2016)
Super City Cops: Undercover Blues (2017)
Super City Cops: Secret Identities (2017)
Systema Paradoxa: All-the-Way House (2021)

Short story collections
Ragnarok and Roll: Tales of Cassie Zukav, Weirdness Magnet (2013), 
Without a License: The Fantastic Worlds of Keith R.A. DeCandido (2015), 
Ragnarok and a Hard Place: More Tales of Cassie Zukav, Weirdness Magnet (forthcoming)

Other comic books
Farscape: The Beginning of the End of the Beginning (cowritten with Rockne S. O'Bannon, art by Tommy Patterson, four-issue miniseries, December 2008-April 2009)
Farscape: Strange Detractors (cowritten with O'Bannon, art by Will Sliney, four-issue miniseries, April–July 2009)
Farscape: D'Argo's Lament (art by Neil Edwards, four-issue miniseries, April–July 2009)
Farscape: Gone and Back (cowritten with O'Bannon, art by Patterson, July–October 2009)
Farscape: D'Argo's Trial (art by Caleb Cleveland, August–November 2009)
Farscape (monthly series, cowritten with O'Bannon, art by Sliney, November 2009–October 2011)
Farscape: D'Argo's Quest (art by Cleveland, December 2009-March 2010)
StarCraft: Ghost Academy Volume 1 (manga, art by Fernando Furukawa, 2010)
Cars: Adventures of Tow Mater #1-4 (art by Travis Hill, four-issue story arc, August–November 2010)
Kung Fu Panda: Tales of the Dragon Warrior #1 (art by Massimo Asaro, backup story, 2013)
Icarus (cowritten with Gregory A. Wilson, art by Áthila Fabbio, 2020)
Resident Evil: Infinite Darkness—The Beginning (art by Carmelo Zagaria & Valentina Cuomo, five-issue miniseries, 2022-2023)

Short fiction
"An Evening in the Bronx with Venom" in The Ultimate Spider-Man (1994), with John Gregory Betancourt
"Improper Procedure" in The Ultimate Silver Surfer (1995), 
"God Sins" in Magic: The Gathering: Distant Planes (1995), 
"UNITed We Fall" in Doctor Who: Decalog 3: Consequences (1996), 
"Arms and the Man" in Untold Tales of Spider-Man (1997), 
"How You Can Prevent Forest Fires" in Urban Nightmares (1997; reprinted in Ragnarok and Roll: Tales of Cassie Zukav, Weirdness Magnet, 2013), 
"A Bone to Pick" in Did You Say Chicks?! (1997), with Marina Frants
"Playing It SAFE" in The Ultimate Hulk (1998), 
"Diary of a False Man" in X-Men: Legends (2000), 
"Raymond's Room" in Doctor Who: Missing Pieces (2001)
"Recurring Character" in The Further Adventures of Xena: Warrior Princess (2001), 
"A Vampire and a Vampire Hunter Walk Into a Bar" in Amazing Stories #608 (2005; reprinted in The Town Drunk, 2006; reprinted in Without a License, 2015)
"Editorial Interference" in Circles in the Hair (2006; reprinted in Without a License, 2015)
"Sunday in the Park with Spot" in Furry Fantastic (2006; reprinted in Without a License, 2015), 
"Life from Lifelessness" in Doctor Who: Short Trips: Destination Prague (2007)
"Meiyo" on the Battlecorps.com web site (2008)
"Three Sides to Every Story" in BattleTech: 25 Years of Art and Fiction (2009)
"Letter from Guadalajara" in More Tales of Zorro (2011)
"Under the King's Bridge" in Liar Liar: Short Stories from Members of the Liars Club (2011; reprinted in Without a License, 2015)
"Ragnarok and Roll" in Tales from the House Band Volume 1 (2011; reprinted in Apocalypse 13, 2012, and in Ragnarok and Roll: Tales of Cassie Zukav, Weirdness Magnet, 2013)
"The Ballad of Big Charlie" in V-Wars (2012; reprinted in Without a License, 2015)
"I Believe I'm Sinkin' Down" in Tales from the House Band Volume 2 (2012; reprinted in Ragnarok and Roll: Tales of Cassie Zukav, Weirdness Magnet, 2013)
"The Stone of the First High Pontiff" in Defending the Future: Best-Laid Plans (2013; reprinted in Without a License, 2015)
"Undine the Boardwalk" in Ragnarok and Roll: Tales of Cassie Zukav, Weirdness Magnet (2013; reprinted in Bad-Ass Faeries: It's Elemental, 2014)
"Love Over and Over" in Ragnarok and Roll: Tales of Cassie Zukav, Weirdness Magnet (2013)
"Cayo Hueso Part 1: A Farewell to Cats" in Ragnarok and Roll: Tales of Cassie Zukav, Weirdness Magnet (2013)
"Cayo Hueso Part 2: The Buck Stops Here" in Ragnarok and Roll: Tales of Cassie Zukav, Weirdness Magnet (2013)
"Cayo Hueso Part 3: Twisting Fate" in Ragnarok and Roll: Tales of Cassie Zukav, Weirdness Magnet (2013)
"God of Blunder" in Ragnarok and Roll: Tales of Cassie Zukav, Weirdness Magnet (2013)
"Stone Cold Whodunit" in With Great Power (2014)
"Fish Out of Water" in Out of Tune (2014), a tale of Cassie Zukav, weirdness magnet
"Time Keeps on Slippin'" in Stargate SG-1/Stargate Atlantis: Far Horizons (2014)
"Down to the Waterline" in Buzzy Mag Online (2015) , a tale of Cassie Zukav, weirdness magnet
"Partners in Crime" in Without a License: The Fantastic Worlds of Keith R.A. DeCandido (2015), set in the same universe as Dragon Precinct
"Seven-Mile Race" in Without a License: The Fantastic Worlds of Keith R.A. DeCandido (2015), a tale of Cassie Zukav, weirdness magnet
"Wild Bill Got Shot" in Without a License: The Fantastic Worlds of Keith R.A. DeCandido (2015)
"Behold a White Tricycle" in Without a License: The Fantastic Worlds of Keith R.A. DeCandido (2015)
"Back in El Paso My Life Will Be Worthless" in The X-Files: Trust No One (2015)
"William Did It" on StoryOfTheMonthClub.com (2015; reprinted in A Baker's Dozen of Magic, 2016), a tale of Cassie Zukav, weirdness magnet
"Send in the Clones" in The Side of Good/The Side of Evil (2015)
"Streets of Fire" in V-Wars: Night Terrors (2016)
"We Seceded Where Others Failed" in Altered States of the Union (2016)
"Right on, Sister!" in Limbus Inc. Book 3 (2016)
"Identity" in Baker Street Irregulars (2017)
"Deep Background" in Aliens: Bug Hunt (2017)
"Behind the Wheel" in TV Gods: Summer Programming (2017), a tale of Cassie Zukav, weirdness magnet
"Live and On the Scene" in Nights of the Living Dead (2017)
"Ganbatte" in Joe Ledger: Unstoppable (2017; winner, Best Short Story, Scribe Awards)
"Sun-Breaker" in Stargate SG-1/Atlantis: Homeworlds (2017)
"Six Red Dragons" in Baker Street Irregulars, Volume 2 (2018)
"House Hunting" in They Keep Killing Glenn (2018)
"Rán for Your Life" in Unearthed (2019), a tale of Cassie Zukav, Weirdness Magnet
"Alien Invasion of Earth!" in Thrilling Adventure Yarns (2019)
"The Silent Dust" in Brave New Girls: Adventures of Gals & Gizmos (2019)
"The Puzzle" in Footprints in the Stars (2019)
"Materfamilias" in Bad Ass Moms (2020)
"Journalistic Integrity" in Pangaea III: Redemption (2020)
"Unguarded" in Horns and Halos (2021)
"Ragnarok and a Hard Place," Indiegogo-supported (2021)
”In Earth and Sky and Sea Strange Things There Be” in Turning the Tied (2021)
The Carpet’s Tale” in The Fans are Buried Tales (2022)
”What You Can Become Tomorrow” in Three Time Travelers Walk Into… (2022)
”History Lesson for Royal Puppies in the Castle Portrait Gallery” in Ludlow Charlington’s Doghouse (2022)
”The Light Shines in the Darkness” in Phenomenons: Every Human Creature (2022)
”Smells Like Teen Spirit” in Tales of Capes and Cowls (2022)
”A Lovely View” in Zorro’s Exploits (2022)
”The Rat’s Tail” in The Eye of Argon and the Further Adventures of Grignr (2022)
”Ticonderoga Beck and the Stalwart Squad” in Thrilling Adventure Yarns 2022 (2022)
"This Little Light of Mine" in Phenomenons: Season of Darkness (2023)
”What Do You Want from Me, I’m Old?” in The Four ???? of the Apocalypse (forthcoming 2023)
”Stop Dragon My Heart Around” in Ragnarok and a Hard Place: More Tales of Cassie Zukav, Weirdness Magnet (forthcoming in 2023)
”Another Dead Body on the Corner” in Joe Ledger: Unbreakable (forthcoming in 2023)
”Know Thyself Deathless” in Double Trouble: An Anthology of Two-Fisted Team-Ups (forthcoming in 2023)
"The Thick Blue Line" in Sherlock Holmes: Cases by Candlelight Volume 2 (forthcoming in 2023)
"The Legend of Long-Ears" in The Good, the Bad, and the Uncanny (forthcoming in 2023)

Reference books
John Winchester Hardcover Ruled Journal (2017)
Orphan Black: Classified Clone Report (2017)
Poison Ivy Hardcover Ruled Journal (2018)
Batman: Quotes from Gotham City (2019)

References

External links

Author's Blog
 Keith DeCandido Interview

Interview World of Warcraft: Cycle of Hatred/StarCraft Ghost: Nova pocketbooks
Interview with Keith R.A. DeCandido, SpaceWesterns.com, 2007
The Chronic Rift's Homepage

1969 births
Living people
American science fiction writers
American comics writers
American writers of Italian descent
People from the Bronx
20th-century American novelists
21st-century American novelists
American male novelists
20th-century American male writers
21st-century American male writers
Novelists from New York (state)
Cardinal Spellman High School (New York City) alumni
Fordham University alumni